This is a list of notable people from Sivas, Turkey.

(in alphabetical order)
Pir Sultan Abdal - Alevi poet
Nebahat Albayrak - Dutch politician and former state secretary in the Netherlands government
Hatice Aslan - actress
Ahmet Ayık - world and Olympic champion  wrestler
Selda Bagcan - musician
Mustafa Balel -  short story writer and novelist
Saint Blaise - Armenian saint, bishop of Sebaste 
Mustafa Çağrıcı -  Islamic theologian
Harutyun Kalents - Armenian artist
Erdal Keser - footballer
Refik Koraltan - politician, speaker of the Grand National Assembly
Hasan Hüseyin Korkmazgil - poet
Mekhitar of Sebastia - founder of the Mekhitarist Order of Armenian Catholic monks
Murad of Sebastia - Armenian fedayee leader
Tülin Şahin - model and presenter
Aşık Veysel Şatıroğlu - poet of the Turkish folk literature
Torkom Saraydarian - Armenian spiritual teacher, author, composer born in Sivas, 1917
Emel Sayın - singer of Turkish classical music
Abdüllatif Şener - politician, Deputy Prime Minister and state minister
Mikail Nersès Sétian - Armenian Catholic bishop in the United States
Nurettin Sözen - politician, former mayor of İstanbul
Çetin Tekindor - actor
İbrahim Toraman - football player
Ali Turan - politician representing Sivas
Ukhtanes of Sebastia - Armenian historian and prelate
Taniel Varouzhan - Armenian poet
Muhsin Yazıcıoğlu - politician who was the president of the BBP party
Cem Yılmaz -  stand-up comedian, actor, cartoonist and screenwriter
Hakan Yılmaz - weightlifter
İsmet Yılmaz - politician representing Sivas
İsmail YK - musician
Sarkis Zabunyan - Armenian conceptual artist

References

 
Sivas